Valdevaqueros is a village and beach in the municipality of Tarifa in the Province of Cadiz in southern Spain. Valdevaqueros has the Spin Out Kite surfing centre, established in 1988, and beachhouse and several hotels and a camping site and is a busy beach during the summer months, and borders the Playa de Los Lances. Behind a large dune created to protect the Punta Paloma coastal battery (currently dismantled). Arroyo Valdevaqueros, on the eastern entrance point has several houses and a coast-guard station. In the western part of the beach is the mouth of the river valley that forms a broad estuary that runs along the beach a few metres from the sea until reaching several hundred metres east.

References

Populated places in the Province of Cádiz
Tarifa
Beaches of Andalusia